Syria, subtitled Archéologie, art et histoire (until 2005 Revue d’art oriental et d’archéologie), is a multidisciplinary and multilingual academic journal covering the Semitic Middle East from prehistory to the Islamic conquest. It is published by the Institut français du Proche-Orient and was established in 1920.

For 19 years (1978–1997), archaeologist Ernest Will edited the journal. The current editor-in-chief is Maurice Sartre (Institut français du Proche-Orient). From 2011 to 2014 the journal was abstracted and indexed in Scopus.

References

External links 

Multilingual journals
Middle Eastern studies journals
Multidisciplinary humanities journals
Publications established in 1920
Annual journals